Kondelaj (also Romanized as Kandalaj, Kandlaj, and Kandlej; also known as Kulli) is a village in Mishab-e Shomali Rural District, in the Central District of Marand County, East Azerbaijan Province, Iran. At the 2006 census, its population was 2,025, in 602 families.

References 

Populated places in Marand County